Aliabad (also Romanized as ‘Alīābād) is a village in Dashtab Rural District, in the Central District of Baft County, Kerman Province, Iran. At the 2006 census, its population was 184, in 33 families.

References 

Populated places in Baft County